Socomba Pass is an Andean mountain pass that connects the Antofagasta Region of Chile with the Argentine province of Salta, in the Los Andes Department for freight traffic by rail.

Socompa Pass, at 3,876 meters above sea level, is located at the foot of the Socompa volcano (6,031 meters). It gives way to the branch of the General Manuel Belgrano Railway on the Argentine side that connects Salta with the port of Antofagasta on the Pacific Ocean. Socomba Pass also allows passage to the Argentine side from a road in poor condition that joins Provincial Route 27 and for which only off-road vehicles are recommended.

References

Mountain passes of Chile
Mountain passes of Argentina
Mountain passes of the Andes
Argentina–Chile border crossings
Landforms of Antofagasta Region
Landforms of Salta Province